was a town located in Kamiina District, Nagano Prefecture, Japan.

As of 2003, the town had an estimated population of 6,976. The total area was 139.36 km².

On March 31, 2006, Takatō, along with the village of Hase (also from Kamiina District), was merged into the expanded city of Ina.

Takatō was famous in Japan for its cherry blossom (sakura) park. The blossoms usually bloom in the first half of April. In 2016 the town was selected as one of The Most Beautiful Villages in Japan.

References

Dissolved municipalities of Nagano Prefecture
Ina, Nagano